A zipper storage bag, slider storage bag, zipper bag, zip lock bag, or zippie is an inexpensive flexible rectangular storage bag, usually transparent, made of polyethylene or similar plastic, that can be sealed and opened many times, either by a slider, which works in a similar way to a zip fastener, or by pinching together the two sides of a mechanical sealing mechanism with one's fingers. Material thickness (gauge) varies; smaller bags are typically 40 to 45 µm.

Many such bags are used to contain foodstuffs, such as sandwiches and freezer storage. Single and multiple small items for sale are often packed in small zipper bags for convenience and visibility.

Several types of reclosable features are available for plastic bags.  Sometimes other types of bag, such as a cloth bag for toiletries fitted with a conventional zip fastener, are described as zipper bags.

One bag was patented by Robert W. Vergobbi on May 18, 1954. In the same year, Minigrip licensed them  as pencil bags. The zipper storage bag's most recognized function was not realized until 1957, when a fifth-grader named Robert Lejeune demonstrated that the bag could also be used safely as a food storage device. Eleven years later, in 1968, Dow Chemical Company began marketing them under the name Ziploc. Widetrack ribs were added in 1982, clicking zippers in 1993 and color in 1997.

See also
Plastic bag
Resealable packaging
Ziploc

References 

American inventions
Bags
Food storage containers
Packaging
Plastics applications
Food packaging
ziplock bags